The 1921 World Hard Court Championships (WHCC) (French: Championnats du Monde de Tennis sur Terre Battue) was the fifth edition of the World Hard Court Championships tennis tournament, considered as the precursor to the French Open, and was held on the clay courts of the Stade Français at the Parc de Saint-Cloud in Paris from 28 May until 5 June 1921.

The Championships was organised by the Fédération Française de Tennis, which had recently separated from the L'Union des Sociétés Française de Sports Athlétiques, the organiser of the first four editions. 

The field at the Championships was stronger this year as the United States sent an official delegation of its best players, including Bill Tilden and Molla Mallory, for the first time. 

Suzanne Lenglen became the first player in the Championships' history to win the singles, doubles and mixed doubles events.

Finals

Men's singles

 Bill Tilden defeated  Jean Washer, 6–3, 6–3, 6–3

Women's singles

 Suzanne Lenglen defeated  Molla Mallory, 6–2, 6–3

Men's doubles

 André Gobert /  William Laurentz defeated  Pierre Albarran /  Alain Gerbault, 6–4, 6–2, 6–8, 6–2

Women's doubles

 Germaine Golding /  Suzanne Lenglen defeated  Dorothy Holman /  Irene Peacock,  6–2, 6–2

Mixed doubles

 Max Decugis /  Suzanne Lenglen defeated  William Laurentz /  Germaine Golding, 6–3, 6–2

External links
 
 

World Hard Court Championships
World Hard Court Championships
World Hard Court Championships
May 1921 sports events
June 1921 sports events
1921 in French tennis